The 2001–02 Chicago Blackhawks season was the team's 76th season of operation in the National Hockey League (NHL). Finishing fifth in the Western Conference, they qualified for the Stanley Cup playoffs for the first time since the 1996–97 season. They were eliminated in the first round of the playoffs by the St. Louis Blues.

Off-season

Regular season
The Blackhawks tied the Detroit Red Wings for the best home record in the league. They also allowed the fewest short-handed goals in the league during the regular season, with just two.

Final standings

Playoffs

Schedule and results

Regular season

|- align="center" bgcolor="#CCFFCC" 
|1||W||October 4, 2001||5–4 || align="left"| @ Vancouver Canucks (2001–02) ||1–0–0–0 || 
|- align="center" bgcolor="#FFBBBB"
|2||L||October 6, 2001||0–4 || align="left"| @ Calgary Flames (2001–02) ||1–1–0–0 || 
|- align="center" bgcolor="#FFBBBB"
|3||L||October 9, 2001||0–1 || align="left"| @ Edmonton Oilers (2001–02) ||1–2–0–0 || 
|- align="center" bgcolor="#CCFFCC" 
|4||W||October 11, 2001||3–0 || align="left"|  Phoenix Coyotes (2001–02) ||2–2–0–0 || 
|- align="center" bgcolor="#FFBBBB"
|5||L||October 12, 2001||4–6 || align="left"| @ Minnesota Wild (2001–02) ||2–3–0–0 || 
|- align="center" 
|6||T||October 14, 2001||2–2 OT|| align="left"|  Columbus Blue Jackets (2001–02) ||2–3–1–0 || 
|- align="center" bgcolor="#CCFFCC" 
|7||W||October 18, 2001||5–3 || align="left"| @ Nashville Predators (2001–02) ||3–3–1–0 || 
|- align="center" 
|8||T||October 20, 2001||2–2 OT|| align="left"| @ Dallas Stars (2001–02) ||3–3–2–0 || 
|- align="center" bgcolor="#CCFFCC" 
|9||W||October 21, 2001||4–2 || align="left"|  Colorado Avalanche (2001–02) ||4–3–2–0 || 
|- align="center" bgcolor="#CCFFCC" 
|10||W||October 23, 2001||6–3 || align="left"|  Calgary Flames (2001–02) ||5–3–2–0 || 
|- align="center" bgcolor="#CCFFCC" 
|11||W||October 25, 2001||4–2 || align="left"|  San Jose Sharks (2001–02) ||6–3–2–0 || 
|- align="center" 
|12||T||October 28, 2001||3–3 OT|| align="left"|  Boston Bruins (2001–02) ||6–3–3–0 || 
|- align="center" bgcolor="#CCFFCC" 
|13||W||October 30, 2001||5–1 || align="left"|  Los Angeles Kings (2001–02) ||7–3–3–0 || 
|-

|- align="center" bgcolor="#CCFFCC" 
|14||W||November 1, 2001||3–2 || align="left"| @ Los Angeles Kings (2001–02) ||8–3–3–0 || 
|- align="center" bgcolor="#FFBBBB"
|15||L||November 2, 2001||2–5 || align="left"| @ Mighty Ducks of Anaheim (2001–02) ||8–4–3–0 || 
|- align="center" bgcolor="#CCFFCC" 
|16||W||November 4, 2001||5–4 || align="left"|  Detroit Red Wings (2001–02) ||9–4–3–0 || 
|- align="center" bgcolor="#CCFFCC" 
|17||W||November 6, 2001||2–1 || align="left"|  Philadelphia Flyers (2001–02) ||10–4–3–0 || 
|- align="center" bgcolor="#CCFFCC" 
|18||W||November 9, 2001||3–1 || align="left"|  Vancouver Canucks (2001–02) ||11–4–3–0 || 
|- align="center" bgcolor="#CCFFCC" 
|19||W||November 11, 2001||3–2 OT|| align="left"|  San Jose Sharks (2001–02) ||12–4–3–0 || 
|- align="center" bgcolor="#FFBBBB"
|20||L||November 13, 2001||2–3 || align="left"| @ Vancouver Canucks (2001–02) ||12–5–3–0 || 
|- align="center" 
|21||T||November 15, 2001||2–2 OT|| align="left"| @ Calgary Flames (2001–02) ||12–5–4–0 || 
|- align="center" bgcolor="#FFBBBB"
|22||L||November 16, 2001||1–7 || align="left"| @ Edmonton Oilers (2001–02) ||12–6–4–0 || 
|- align="center" bgcolor="#FFBBBB"
|23||L||November 21, 2001||3–4 || align="left"| @ Nashville Predators (2001–02) ||12–7–4–0 || 
|- align="center" 
|24||T||November 23, 2001||2–2 OT|| align="left"| @ Columbus Blue Jackets (2001–02) ||12–7–5–0 || 
|- align="center" 
|25||T||November 25, 2001||4–4 OT|| align="left"| @ Detroit Red Wings (2001–02) ||12–7–6–0 || 
|- align="center" 
|26||T||November 28, 2001||3–3 OT|| align="left"|  Vancouver Canucks (2001–02) ||12–7–7–0 || 
|- align="center" bgcolor="#FFBBBB"
|27||L||November 30, 2001||1–2 || align="left"|  Toronto Maple Leafs (2001–02) ||12–8–7–0 || 
|-

|- align="center" bgcolor="#FFBBBB"
|28||L||December 1, 2001||1–4 || align="left"| @ Toronto Maple Leafs (2001–02) ||12–9–7–0 || 
|- align="center" bgcolor="#CCFFCC" 
|29||W||December 3, 2001||3–2 || align="left"| @ Montreal Canadiens (2001–02) ||13–9–7–0 || 
|- align="center" bgcolor="#CCFFCC" 
|30||W||December 5, 2001||4–2 || align="left"|  Minnesota Wild (2001–02) ||14–9–7–0 || 
|- align="center" bgcolor="#CCFFCC" 
|31||W||December 7, 2001||4–3 || align="left"|  New York Islanders (2001–02) ||15–9–7–0 || 
|- align="center" bgcolor="#FFBBBB"
|32||L||December 9, 2001||2–5 || align="left"|  Los Angeles Kings (2001–02) ||15–10–7–0 || 
|- align="center" 
|33||T||December 12, 2001||2–2 OT|| align="left"|  St. Louis Blues (2001–02) ||15–10–8–0 || 
|- align="center" bgcolor="#CCFFCC" 
|34||W||December 14, 2001||3–1 || align="left"| @ Atlanta Thrashers (2001–02) ||16–10–8–0 || 
|- align="center" bgcolor="#FFBBBB"
|35||L||December 15, 2001||2–5 || align="left"| @ Nashville Predators (2001–02) ||16–11–8–0 || 
|- align="center" bgcolor="#CCFFCC" 
|36||W||December 17, 2001||2–0 || align="left"| @ Detroit Red Wings (2001–02) ||17–11–8–0 || 
|- align="center" bgcolor="#CCFFCC" 
|37||W||December 19, 2001||6–5 || align="left"| @ Buffalo Sabres (2001–02) ||18–11–8–0 || 
|- align="center" bgcolor="#CCFFCC" 
|38||W||December 21, 2001||5–1 || align="left"|  Edmonton Oilers (2001–02) ||19–11–8–0 || 
|- align="center" bgcolor="#FFBBBB"
|39||L||December 23, 2001||0–5 || align="left"|  Detroit Red Wings (2001–02) ||19–12–8–0 || 
|- align="center" bgcolor="#CCFFCC" 
|40||W||December 26, 2001||3–1 || align="left"| @ St. Louis Blues (2001–02) ||20–12–8–0 || 
|- align="center" bgcolor="#CCFFCC" 
|41||W||December 27, 2001||3–1 || align="left"|  Colorado Avalanche (2001–02) ||21–12–8–0 || 
|- align="center" bgcolor="#CCFFCC" 
|42||W||December 30, 2001||2–1 || align="left"|  Mighty Ducks of Anaheim (2001–02) ||22–12–8–0 || 
|- align="center" bgcolor="#CCFFCC" 
|43||W||December 31, 2001||5–4 OT|| align="left"| @ Ottawa Senators (2001–02) ||23–12–8–0 || 
|-

|- align="center" bgcolor="#CCFFCC" 
|44||W||January 4, 2002||2–0 || align="left"|  Tampa Bay Lightning (2001–02) ||24–12–8–0 || 
|- align="center" bgcolor="#CCFFCC" 
|45||W||January 6, 2002||2–0 || align="left"|  Pittsburgh Penguins (2001–02) ||25–12–8–0 || 
|- align="center" bgcolor="#FFBBBB"
|46||L||January 9, 2002||3–7 || align="left"| @ Colorado Avalanche (2001–02) ||25–13–8–0 || 
|- align="center" bgcolor="#CCFFCC" 
|47||W||January 10, 2002||2–1 || align="left"|  Columbus Blue Jackets (2001–02) ||26–13–8–0 || 
|- align="center" bgcolor="#FFBBBB"
|48||L||January 12, 2002||4–5 || align="left"| @ Columbus Blue Jackets (2001–02) ||26–14–8–0 || 
|- align="center" bgcolor="#CCFFCC" 
|49||W||January 14, 2002||2–1 || align="left"|  Edmonton Oilers (2001–02) ||27–14–8–0 || 
|- align="center" bgcolor="#CCFFCC" 
|50||W||January 16, 2002||3–0 || align="left"| @ Florida Panthers (2001–02) ||28–14–8–0 || 
|- align="center" 
|51||T||January 18, 2002||2–2 OT|| align="left"| @ Tampa Bay Lightning (2001–02) ||28–14–9–0 || 
|- align="center" bgcolor="#CCFFCC" 
|52||W||January 20, 2002||3–2 || align="left"|  Dallas Stars (2001–02) ||29–14–9–0 || 
|- align="center" bgcolor="#FFBBBB"
|53||L||January 23, 2002||1–4 || align="left"|  Phoenix Coyotes (2001–02) ||29–15–9–0 || 
|- align="center" bgcolor="#CCFFCC" 
|54||W||January 25, 2002||2–1 || align="left"|  St. Louis Blues (2001–02) ||30–15–9–0 || 
|- align="center" bgcolor="#FFBBBB"
|55||L||January 28, 2002||1–2 || align="left"| @ Boston Bruins (2001–02) ||30–16–9–0 || 
|- align="center" bgcolor="#FFBBBB"
|56||L||January 30, 2002||1–3 || align="left"| @ New Jersey Devils (2001–02) ||30–17–9–0 || 
|-

|- align="center" bgcolor="#CCFFCC" 
|57||W||February 6, 2002||5–2 || align="left"| @ Phoenix Coyotes (2001–02) ||31–17–9–0 || 
|- align="center" bgcolor="#FFBBBB"
|58||L||February 8, 2002||2–4 || align="left"| @ San Jose Sharks (2001–02) ||31–18–9–0 || 
|- align="center" bgcolor="#CCFFCC" 
|59||W||February 9, 2002||3–2 || align="left"| @ Colorado Avalanche (2001–02) ||32–18–9–0 || 
|- align="center" bgcolor="#CCFFCC" 
|60||W||February 13, 2002||5–4 || align="left"|  Florida Panthers (2001–02) ||33–18–9–0 || 
|- align="center" bgcolor="#FFBBBB"
|61||L||February 26, 2002||4–5 || align="left"| @ Philadelphia Flyers (2001–02) ||33–19–9–0 || 
|- align="center" bgcolor="#FFBBBB"
|62||L||February 27, 2002||2–3 || align="left"|  Montreal Canadiens (2001–02) ||33–20–9–0 || 
|-

|- align="center" bgcolor="#CCFFCC" 
|63||W||March 3, 2002||2–1 || align="left"|  Mighty Ducks of Anaheim (2001–02) ||34–20–9–0 || 
|- align="center" bgcolor="#FF6F6F"
|64||OTL||March 5, 2002||1–2 OT|| align="left"|  Carolina Hurricanes (2001–02) ||34–20–9–1 || 
|- align="center" bgcolor="#CCFFCC" 
|65||W||March 7, 2002||5–1 || align="left"|  New York Rangers (2001–02) ||35–20–9–1 || 
|- align="center" bgcolor="#FFBBBB"
|66||L||March 11, 2002||1–2 || align="left"| @ Los Angeles Kings (2001–02) ||35–21–9–1 || 
|- align="center" bgcolor="#FFBBBB"
|67||L||March 12, 2002||1–3 || align="left"| @ Phoenix Coyotes (2001–02) ||35–22–9–1 || 
|- align="center" 
|68||T||March 15, 2002||1–1 OT|| align="left"| @ Mighty Ducks of Anaheim (2001–02) ||35–22–10–1 || 
|- align="center" 
|69||T||March 16, 2002||2–2 OT|| align="left"| @ San Jose Sharks (2001–02) ||35–22–11–1 || 
|- align="center" 
|70||T||March 18, 2002||2–2 OT|| align="left"|  Dallas Stars (2001–02) ||35–22–12–1 || 
|- align="center" bgcolor="#FFBBBB"
|71||L||March 20, 2002||1–3 || align="left"|  New Jersey Devils (2001–02) ||35–23–12–1 || 
|- align="center" bgcolor="#CCFFCC" 
|72||W||March 24, 2002||4–3 OT|| align="left"|  St. Louis Blues (2001–02) ||36–23–12–1 || 
|- align="center" bgcolor="#CCFFCC" 
|73||W||March 27, 2002||4–1 || align="left"|  Nashville Predators (2001–02) ||37–23–12–1 || 
|- align="center" bgcolor="#CCFFCC" 
|74||W||March 29, 2002||3–1 || align="left"| @ Minnesota Wild (2001–02) ||38–23–12–1 || 
|- align="center" bgcolor="#CCFFCC" 
|75||W||March 31, 2002||2–1 || align="left"|  Minnesota Wild (2001–02) ||39–23–12–1 || 
|-

|- align="center" bgcolor="#FFBBBB"
|76||L||April 3, 2002||1–3 || align="left"|  Nashville Predators (2001–02) ||39–24–12–1 || 
|- align="center" bgcolor="#FFBBBB"
|77||L||April 5, 2002||1–5 || align="left"| @ St. Louis Blues (2001–02) ||39–25–12–1 || 
|- align="center" bgcolor="#CCFFCC" 
|78||W||April 7, 2002||3–2 || align="left"|  Calgary Flames (2001–02) ||40–25–12–1 || 
|- align="center" bgcolor="#FFBBBB"
|79||L||April 9, 2002||1–3 || align="left"| @ Washington Capitals (2001–02) ||40–26–12–1 || 
|- align="center" 
|80||T||April 10, 2002||3–3 OT|| align="left"| @ Detroit Red Wings (2001–02) ||40–26–13–1 || 
|- align="center" bgcolor="#FFBBBB"
|81||L||April 12, 2002||1–3 || align="left"| @ Dallas Stars (2001–02) ||40–27–13–1 || 
|- align="center" bgcolor="#CCFFCC" 
|82||W||April 14, 2002||2–0 || align="left"|  Columbus Blue Jackets (2001–02) ||41–27–13–1 || 
|-

|-
| Legend:

Playoffs

|- align="center" bgcolor="#CCFFCC"
| 1 ||W|| April 18, 2002 || 2–1 || align="left"| @ St. Louis Blues || Blackhawks lead 1–0 || 
|- align="center" bgcolor="#FFBBBB"
| 2 ||L|| April 20, 2002 || 0–2 || align="left"| @ St. Louis Blues || Series tied 1–1 || 
|- align="center" bgcolor="#FFBBBB"
| 3 ||L|| April 21, 2002 || 0–4 || align="left"| St. Louis Blues || Blues lead 2–1 || 
|- align="center" bgcolor="#FFBBBB"
| 4 ||L|| April 23, 2002 || 0–1 || align="left"| St. Louis Blues || Blues lead 3–1 || 
|- align="center" bgcolor="#FFBBBB"
| 5 ||L|| April 25, 2002 || 3–5 || align="left"| @ St. Louis Blues || Blues win 4–1 || 
|-

|-
| Legend:

Player statistics

Scoring
 Position abbreviations: C = Center; D = Defense; G = Goaltender; LW = Left Wing; RW = Right Wing
  = Joined team via a transaction (e.g., trade, waivers, signing) during the season. Stats reflect time with the Blackhawks only.
  = Left team via a transaction (e.g., trade, waivers, release) during the season. Stats reflect time with the Blackhawks only.

Goaltending

Awards and records

Transactions
The Blackhawks were involved in the following transactions from June 10, 2001, the day after the deciding game of the 2001 Stanley Cup Finals, through June 13, 2002, the day of the deciding game of the 2002 Stanley Cup Finals.

Trades

Players acquired

Players lost

Signings

Draft picks
Chicago's draft picks at the 2001 NHL Entry Draft held at the National Car Rental Center in Sunrise, Florida.

See also
2001–02 NHL season

Notes

References

Chic
Chic
Chicago Blackhawks seasons
Chic
Chic